Mzhavanadze is a Georgian surname that may refer to:

 Kakhaber Mzhavanadze (born 1978), Georgian footballer
 Vasil Mzhavanadze (1902–1988), Soviet politician, First Secretary of the Communist Party of the Georgian SSR in 1953–1972

Surnames of Georgian origin
Georgian-language surnames